Andriy Zaporozhan (born 21 March 1983) is a Ukrainian professional football midfielder who plays for Ukrainian club Livyi Bereh Kyiv.

He became the author of the first goal for FC Oleksandriya in the European competitions.

Honours
 Ukraine national team
 Football at the 2007 Summer Universiade: Champion
 Football at the 2009 Summer Universiade: Champion

FC Oleksandriya
 2010–11 Ukrainian First League: Champion
 2014–15 Ukrainian First League: Champion
 2013–14 Ukrainian First League: Runner-up

FC Borysfen Boryspil
 2002–03 Ukrainian First League: Runner-up
 1999–2000 Ukrainian Second League: Champion

External links
 

1983 births
Living people
Ukrainian footballers
Ukraine student international footballers
Ukrainian football managers
FC Borysfen Boryspil players
FC Borysfen-2 Boryspil players
FC Dnister Ovidiopol players
FC Systema-Boreks Borodianka players
FC Enerhetyk Burshtyn players
FC Oleksandriya players
FC Livyi Bereh Kyiv players
Ukrainian Premier League players
Ukrainian First League players
Ukrainian Second League players
Association football defenders
Universiade gold medalists for Ukraine
Universiade medalists in football
Medalists at the 2007 Summer Universiade
Medalists at the 2009 Summer Universiade
Sportspeople from Odesa Oblast